Syracuse railway station, or Syracuse station, may refer to:
New York Central Railroad Passenger and Freight Station, in Syracuse, New York (United States)
Siracusa railway station, in Syracuse, Sicily (Italy)
William F. Walsh Regional Transportation Center, in Syracuse, New York (United States)